A lamprey is a parasitic aquatic vertebrate with a toothed, funnel-like sucking mouth.

Lamprey may refer to:

Lamprey (surname)
Lamprey River, a river in southeastern New Hampshire, U.S.
Lamprey (comics), a character from Marvel Comics' original Squadron Supreme series
Lamprey (G.I. Joe), a set of fictional characters in the G.I. Joe universe
Lamprey (album), an album by Bettie Serveert
USS Lamprey (SS-372), a Balao-class submarine of the United States Navy
Lamprey, a Beast General character in Shadow Raiders
Lamprey, a character in A Trick to Catch the Old One
Lamprey, Manitoba, an unincorporated place in Manitoba, Canada
Lamprey railway station in Lamprey, Manitoba, Canada

See also
Russian submarine Minoga (Минога - Lamprey), a submarine built for the Imperial Russian Navy
 Lampiri (disambiguation)
 Lampre, an Italian steel producer and cycling team sponsor